Paul Angenvoorth (born 10 August 1945) is a German long-distance runner. He competed in the marathon at the 1972 Summer Olympics representing West Germany.

References

External links

1945 births
Living people
Athletes (track and field) at the 1972 Summer Olympics
German male long-distance runners
German male marathon runners
Olympic athletes of West Germany
20th-century German people